Godart is the surname of the following people:

 Jean-Baptiste Godart (1775–1825), French entomologist
 Justin Godart (1871–1956), French politician
 Louis Godart (born 1945), Italian historian
 Maxime Godart (born 1999), French actor
 Pascal Godart, French classical pianist
 Frédéric Godart, French researcher and sociologist

See also
Godard (surname)